Carmo di Brocchi is a  mountain of the Ligurian Alps, in Italy.

Etymology 
The mountain was in former times referred as Monte dei Brocchi. The term Carmo appears in several other Ligurian toponyms with the meaning of Mount.

Geography 
Carmo di Brocchi belongs to the province of Imperia, in Liguria. In the SOIUSA (International Standardized Mountain Subdivision of the Alps) it belongs to the Nodo del Monte Saccarello group and Costiera Monega-Carmo di Brocchi subgroup (SOIUSA code: I/A-1.II-A.1.b). Carmo di Brocchi is located on the ridge dividing the valleys of Argentina and Giara di Rezzo, which also is the border between the comuni of Rezzo and Molini di Triora. Its summit is marked by a cairn bearing a Summit cross end containing a summit register.

Access to the summit 

The summit of Carmo di Brocchi can be reached on foot starting from Colle del Garezzo (NW) or from Passo della Teglia (SW).

Nature conservation 
The mountain since 2007 is on the border of the Parco naturale regionale delle Alpi Liguri. In the area can be seen black grouses and lives a chamois' herd.

Maps 
 Italian official maps by Istituto Geografico Militare (IGM), 1:25.000 and 1:100.000 scale (also on line version)
 Carta dei sentieri e dei rifugi scale 1:50.000 nr. 15 Albenga, Alassio, Savona, I.G.C. - Turin 
 Carta dei sentieri e stradale scala 1:25.000 nr. 23 Sanremo Ventimiglia Bassa val Roia Val Nervia, Fraternali editore - Ciriè

References

One-thousanders of Italy
Mountains of Liguria
Mountains of the Ligurian Alps
Province of Imperia